A beltweigher or belt weigher is a piece of industrial control equipment used to gauge the mass or flow rate of material travelling over a troughed (cupped) conveyor belt of any length which is able to adequately contain the material being weighed.  These are also known as belt scales, dynamic scales, conveyor scales, and in-motion weighers.  Many such  check weighers or feed weighers are an active part of the process flow control of the conveyor line.

A belt weigher replaces a short section of the support mechanism of the belt, which might be one or more sets of idler rollers, or a short section of channel or plate.   This weighed support is mounted on load cells, either pivoted, counterbalanced or not, or fully suspended. The mass measured by the load cells is integrated with the belt speed to compute the mass of material moving on the belt, after allowing for the mass of the belt itself.  Belt weighers generally include the necessary electronics to perform this calculation, often in the form of a small industrialized microprocessor system.

A belt weigher is normally mounted in a well supported straight section of belt, with no vertical or sideways curvature, and as close to level as is practicable.  The weighed support must be aligned vertically and horizontally with the adjacent supports to avoid tensile forces in the belt skewing the measurement.
Due to the belt tension variation, frequent check calibration must be done. 

Outputs from belt weighers are typically:
 pulses at predefined increments of mass
 an analogue signal proportional to the flow rate

In addition, some belt weigher controllers will offer features such as driving an output to stop the belt when a predefined mass of material has been measured, or a range of alarms to indicate nil flow, belt slippage and belt stoppage.

Uses include mineral and aggregate extraction, continuous mixing processes, control of variable rate feeders, port handling and ship loading processes.

References 
What are Conveyor Belt Scales
Why You Should Go For A Belt Scale Otherwise Known As Belt Weigher?
Industrial equipment
Weighing instruments